Belovodka is a rural locality (a settlement) and the administrative center of Belovodskoye Rural Settlement, Mglinsky District, Bryansk Oblast, Russia. The population was 498 as of 2010. There are 4 streets.

Geography 
Belovodka is located 4 km west of Mglin (the district's administrative centre) by road. Borhshchov is the nearest rural locality.

References 

Rural localities in Mglinsky District